Traismauer is a municipality in the district of Sankt Pölten-Land in Lower Austria, Austria.
It was established by the Romans, probably on a location of prior settlements. Some Roman buildings survive to this day.

Population

See also
Gemeinlebarn

References

Cities and towns in St. Pölten-Land District